During the 1999–2000 Spanish football season, Valencia competed in La Liga.

Season summary 

During Spring of 1999, after rumours of Claudio Ranieri being linked to Atlético Madrid the club replaced the Italian head coach for the upcoming season, the final choices were Radomir Antić from Atlético Madrid with a contract until 2000 with colchoneros and Argentine Héctor Cúper from RCD Mallorca free in June and whom, finally, was appointed as new manager. Valencia CF emerged as a world football heavyweight after reaching the Champions League final. New coach Héctor Cúper focused heavily on making the defence invincible, although, despite the general perception of a much more defensive Valencia, they actually conceded the same amount of league goals as they had under previous coach Claudio Ranieri. Among the key players were playmaker Gaizka Mendieta (voted as the best midfielder in the Champions League), fellow midfielder Gerard, goalkeeper Santiago Cañizares, winger Javier Farinós and striker Claudio López, who was sold to Lazio at the end of the season. Lazio had been Valencia's opponents in the quarter-final of the Champions League, which resulted in a 5–2 victory for Valencia against the eventual Italian champions. Gerard was also sold, to the team that had nurtured him, Barcelona, for £15 million. Barcelona had been Valencia's opponents in the semi-finals, and had been crushed 4–1 away. A 2–1 defeat at the Camp Nou still saw Valencia progress to the final at Stade de France, where they came up against Real Madrid in the first ever all-Spanish final of the competition. Valencia's dreams were shattered by a clear 3–0 defeat.

Squad

Transfers

Left club during season

Competitions

La Liga

League table

Results by round

Matches

Copa del Rey 

Eightfinals

UEFA Champions League 

Third qualifying round

Group F

Group B

Quarter-final

Semi-final

Final

Statistics

Player Statistics

La Liga 
  Gaizka Mendieta 13
  Claudio López 11
  Javier Farinós 6
  Juan Sánchez 5
  Angulo 5
  Adrian Ilie 5
  Óscar 4

Champions League 
  Claudio López 5
  Gaizka Mendieta 5

References 

Valencia CF seasons
Valencia